The Ollin Yoliztli Prize (Spanish: Premio Ollin Yoliztli) was a prestigious but short-lived international prize that was bestowed by the President of Mexico for three consecutive years — 1980, 1981, and 1982 — to living Spanish literature poets, novelists, essayists, and playwrights.

History

Eligibility and criteria 

The Ollin Yoliztli Prize was open to all Spanish language writers of literature.  The recognition was for collective works rather than any single work and was structured to be presented in any of the four literary genres: poetry, novels, essays, and drama.

Ollín yoliztli, means "life movement" or "life force" in Náhuatl. The prize each year was presented by the President of Mexico, José López Portillo. His sister, Margarita López Portillo (es) (2014–2006), was a prolific novelist and his wife, Carmen Romano, was an exponent of fine arts and humanities.

Founding sponsor 
The President's wife established the prize to promote Spanish literature and its important authors — and to strengthen cultural links among Spanish speaking countries.  She was instrumental in launching several large-scale cultural programs, which led to the founding of The National Fund for Social Activities (Spanish: Fondo Nacional para Actividades Sociales), commonly known by its acronym, FONAPAS.  She prevailed in initiatives to make fine arts more accessible, particularly for low-income and young people.  Her initiatives included erecting new fine arts venues and establishing professional orchestras.  One such venue in Mexico City, which opened in 1979, bears the named Centro Cultural Ollin Yoliztli and is home to several cultural organizations, including the Mexico City Philharmonic Orchestra, founded in 1978.

While many cultural initiatives of Portillo and his wife endure today, the economic, diplomatic, and cultural wisdom of their efforts was not without criticism.  In particular, critics viewed their cultural initiatives as wasteful and part of a larger scheme of building personal projects with public money. Control of a wide range of projects was assigned to family members and close associates. Portillo's presidency ended in November 1982.  But criticism was amplified toward the end of his term, starting in February 1982, after a sharp devaluation of the peso and ensuing economic crisis. The succession-continuity of the Ollin Yolilztli Prize ended when Portillo's presidential term ended.

Juries and award ceremonies 
The juries for the Ollin Yoliztli Prize were formed under the auspices of the Festival Internacional Cervantino in Guanajuato, Mexico.  When establishment of the prize was announced on November 10, 1979, by Hector Vasconcelos (es), Director of the Cervantes Festival, the jury had been selected.  Their appointments were for life.  The jury was composed of six major critics and writers.

 José Luis Martínez Rodríguez, from Mexico, was a journalist from Mexico City and director of Fondo de Cultura Económica
 Ramón Xirau, from Mexico, is a poet and a member of National College of Mexico
 Juan Marichal, from Spain, was a professor of Spanish literature at Harvard
 Dámaso Alonso, from Spain, was president of the Royal Spanish Academy in Madrid
 Emir Rodríguez Monegal, from Uruguay, was a professor of Spanish literature at Yale
 Enrique Anderson Imbert, from Argentina, was Professor Emeritus of Spanish literature at Harvard

The festival dates back  years, to 1953, but was formalized  years ago, in 1972. The festival is one of the most important artistic and cultural events in Mexico and Latin America.

 In 1981, the jury, according to Vasconcelos (es), reached its decision unanimously in favor of the Argentine poet during the first meeting of the jurists, Monday morning, May 11, 1981.
 The award ceremony took place in early June.  The President of Mexico, José López Portillo, presented the award at his official residence, Los Pinos.  Attendees included the Emilio Casinello Auban, Ambassador of Spain in Mexico from 1982 to 1985.  The award to Jorge Guillen and the presence of the Ambassador had diplomatic overtones because five years earlier, in 1977, Mexico had reestablished diplomatic relations with Spain following the end of Francoist Spain in 1975.  The lower prize amount was mostly the result of a sharp devaluation of the peso in February 1982 and subsequent economic crisis.

Prize winners 
 1980: Octavio Paz, from Mexico, then 66 years old, won the inaugural Ollin Yoliztli Prize – approximately $73,000
 1981: Jorge Luis Borges, from Argentina, a blind poet and short-story author, then 81 years old, the award was presented by the President of Mexico, José López Portillo – 6 million pesos ($70,000)
 1982: Jorge Guillen, from Spain, then 89 years old; the award was presented by the President of Mexico, José López Portillo – $37,500

References 

Awards established in 1980
Mexican literary awards
1980 establishments in Mexico
1983 disestablishments
Literary awards honoring lifetime achievement
Spanish-language literary awards
Literary awards honoring writers
Poetry awards